Prosecuting Casey Anthony is a 2013 American made-for-television drama film about the Casey Anthony trial.

Cast
 Rob Lowe as Jeff Ashton
 Elizabeth Mitchell as Linda Drane Burdick
 Oscar Nuñez as Jose Baez
 Virginia Welch as Casey Anthony
 Marina Stephenson Kerr as Cindy Anthony
 Marisa Ramirez as Rita Ashton 
 Kevin Dunn as George Anthony

References

External links
 
 

2013 television films
2013 films
2013 drama films
Lifetime (TV network) films
Films directed by Peter Werner
American drama television films
2010s American films